William von Moll Berczy (December 10, 1744 – February 5, 1813) was a German-born Upper Canada pioneer and painter. He is considered one of the co-founders of the Town of York, Upper Canada, now Toronto, Ontario, Canada.

Biography
Berczy was born in Wallerstein, Swabia, Electorate of Bavaria (part of the Holy Roman Empire and now in Germany) as a son of the Wirklicher Hofrat (Albrecht Theodor Moll) and Johanna Josepha Walpurga Moll (née Hefele). Berczy was originally named Johann Albrecht Ulrich Moll, but following marriage changed his name.

He studied at the Akademie der bildenden Künste in Vienna and at the University of Jena in Saxony. His early career was spent in several European countries, including Poland, Switzerland, and Italy. In 1792, Berczy sailed for the Americas, settling in Philadelphia, then setting up a business in York, Upper Canada (now Toronto). A few years later, his work took him to Lower Canada (Quebec).

Berczy married, on November 1, 1785, Jeanne-Charlotte Berczy née Allamand (1760–1839) of Lausanne (canton of Bern, now - since 1803 - canton of Vaud), Switzerland. They had two sons, William Bent Berczy and Charles Albert Berczy. His son Charles Albert Berczy became the second postmaster of Toronto.

Berczy helped John Graves Simcoe establish a settlement north of York, called German Mills with his migrants under the German Land Company, which later became the town of Markham.

Berczy built homes in York and Markham, including Russell Abbey in York.

Berczy painted. His two best known pictures are a full-length portrait of the Mohawk chief Thayendanegea (Joseph Brant) (c. 1807) and a group portrait of the Woolsey Family (1809). Although best known for his portraits, he also carried out religious paintings and architectural work, including plans for Christ Church Cathedral in Montreal in 1803, and was a surveyor.

Berczy travelled to New York City during the War of 1812 and was stranded when attempting to travel. He first stayed in Middlebury, Vermont with friends, then to Albany, New York then to New York City from which he planned to travel to England. He fell ill while in New York and died while in the care of friends. He was buried in an unmarked grave at Trinity Church as William Burksay. His wife moved in with her son William and died on September 18, 1839 in Sainte-Mélanie, Lower Canada. Berczy was also survived by his other son, Charles Albert Berczy.

Legacy
An elementary school in central Markham is named William Berczy Public School in his honour. The school, founded in 1967, has approximately 600 students in grades K-8. Also in honour of this founder, the then Town of Markham named one of its densely populated neighbourhoods after him, the Berczy Village. Berczy Creek is a tributary of the Rouge River in Markham. A bronze statue of Berczy will be situated in at Berczy Square, a park to be built at Berczy Village near Kennedy Road and 16th Avenue in Markham. Within Berczy Village is William Berczy Settlement Historical Cemetery.

William Berczy Boulevard is a major road from Major Mackenzie Drive to 16th Avenue in Berczy Village, Berczy Gate is a short street near Highway 7 and Ninth Line and Berczy Creek Way is a short road near 16th Avenue and Warden Avenue in Markham. In Toronto a roadway called Leader Lane was renamed from Berczy Lane. There is also Berczy Street in Aurora running next to the train station.

Berczy Park is a small park located behind the Gooderham Building at Front Street and Wellington Street in Toronto, Ontario. The park had been vacant for many decades and once used as a parking lot after the buildings on the site were demolished. A tree-lined city park emerged after the late 1980s and has undergone renovations from 2015 to 2016.

Berczy Street Park and Berczy Street are found in Barrie, Ontario. Berczy-Strasse is a street named for him in Wallerstein, Bavaria.

In 2016, Berczy was named a National Historic Person.

In fiction
Berczy is the subject of John Steffler's biographical novel German Mills: A Novel Pertaining to the Life and Times of William Berczy (Gaspereau Press, 2015).

References

Further reading 
 "William Berczy Co-Founder of Toronto" written by John Andre in 1967 as a centennial project for the Borough of York.
 
 Hartmut Froeschle [Fröschle]: Adler auf dem Ahornbaum. Studien zur Einwanderung, Siedlung, Kultur-und Literaturgeschichte der Deutschen in Kanada. Herausgegeben und eingeleitet von Lothar Zimmermann. Toronto 1997 (Deutschkanadische Schriften, B. Sachbücher, Bd. 7), pp. 53–63: "Williem Berczy, ein deutschkanadischer Pionier".
 Hartmut Froeschle [Fröschle]: Berczy trifft Goethe. In: Deutschkanadisches Jahrbuch / German Canadian Yearbook 15 (1998), pp. 89–97.
 
 Pioneers of the Don by Charles Sauriol 1995  (pp288–298 "The Story of the German Mills")
 Ronald J. Stagg: Berczy, Williem [...]. In: Dictionary of Canadian Biography, Francess G. Halpenny, General Editor, vol. 5. 1801-1820. Toronto, Buffalo, London 1983, pp. 70–72.
 B[eate] Stock: Berczy, William (Johann Albrecht Ulrich Moll). In: (K[laus] G[erhard]) Saur [Publisher]: Allgemeines Künstler-Lexikon. Die Bildenden Künstler aller Zeiten und Völker, Bd. 9. München, Leipzig 1994, pp. 255–256.

External links

 Biography at the Dictionary of Canadian Biography Online
 German Pioneers of Toronto and Markham Township - The Story of William Berczy
 Article about Berczy Park in Toronto Star, Dec 22, 2008, giving more detail about his life: "Oasis amid skyscrapers has a magic of its own"
 Berczy and the early Settlement of Markham in History of Toronto and County of York, Ontario Vol 1 1885 page 114
 Berczy in the History of Markham  
 The William Berczy Paintings
 ; also in French

1744 births
1813 deaths
18th-century Canadian painters
18th-century male artists
18th-century German painters
18th-century German male artists
19th-century Canadian painters
19th-century German painters
19th-century German male artists
Academy of Fine Arts Vienna alumni
Artists from Toronto
Canadian male painters
German emigrants to pre-Confederation Canada
German male painters
People from Donau-Ries
People from Markham, Ontario
Persons of National Historic Significance (Canada)
Pre-Confederation Ontario people
University of Jena alumni
19th-century Canadian male artists